Setrawa tahsil is located in Jodhpur. It dates back to 14th century.  Jodha, the founder of Jodhpur has roots from Setrawa. panchayat village in Setrawa Tehsil, Jodhpur District, Rajasthan, western India. It is known for its Warriors and it is a nursery for the Indian Army and the BSF.

There are three villages in the Setrawa gram panchayat: Setrawa, Khanori and jaitsar .

Geography
National Highway 114 and mega highway passes through Setrawa. The village is at an elevation of 273 m above mean sea level.

Demographics
In the 2001 India census, the village of Setrawa reported 3,219 inhabitants with 1,788 (55.5%) being male and 1,431 (44.5%) being female, for a gender ratio of 800 females per thousand males.

References

External links
 

Villages in Jodhpur district